Bantul is a regency located in the Special Region of Yogyakarta, Indonesia. It is located on the island of Java. The regency's population was 911,503 at the 2010 Census, but has risen to 985,770 at the 2020 Census. Like many regencies on the island of Java, it is densely populated with roughly 1,945 people per square kilometre in 2020, although this is largely because the north of the regency partly surrounds the city of Yogyakarta and contains many suburban communities, notably in the densely-populated districts of Banguntapan, Sewon and Kasihan.

The regency is bordered by the city of Yogyakarta and Sleman regency to the north, the regency of Kulon Progo to the west, the Gunung Kidul Regency to the east and the Indian Ocean to the south. The town of Bantul is the administrative centre.

The village of Kemusuk in the Sedayu District in the northwest of the regency is the birthplace of former Indonesian President, Suharto.

2006 earthquake 

On 27 May 2006 an earthquake measuring 6.3 on the Richter scale struck near Java's southern coast causing widespread damage. Bantul Regency was the region most affected by the disaster. Around 4,100 residents of Bantul Regency were killed, 12,000 were injured. 72,000 houses were destroyed, and 137,000 were damaged.

Administrative districts
Bantul Regency is divided into seventeen districts (kapanewon), listed below with their areas and their populations at the 2010 Census and the 2020 Census. The table also includes the location of the district administrative centres, and the number of villages (rural desa and urban kelurahan) within each district.

Turtles nesting
Bantul Regency has two locations of turtles nesting, in Gua Cemara Beach and Pelangi Beach. Both have only more than 10 nests each in a year. Nesting period is in July and August.

References

External links